Ragnar Oratmangoen (born 21 January 1998) is a Dutch professional footballer who plays as a winger or attacking midfielder for Eredivisie club Groningen.

Career
Born in Oss, Oratmangoen turned professional with NEC in April 2016. In December 2017 he signed a six-month loan contract with FC Oss, effective from January 2018.

After Oratmangoen had been demoted to the reserve team Jong NEC as a result of fierce competition in his position ahead of the 2019–20 season, he moved to SC Cambuur on a free transfer on 24 July 2019. There, he signed a two-year contract with an option for another season. He then signed with Go Ahead Eagles in May 2021, who had also won promotion to the Eredivisie.

On 15 April 2022, Oratmangoen signed a three-year contract with a two-year option with Groningen, starting from the 2022–23 season.

Personal life
Born in the Netherlands, Oratmangoen is a Muslim of Indonesian descent, with his grandparents being from Maluku.

Career statistics

References

1998 births
Living people
Dutch people of Indonesian descent
Sportspeople from Oss
Dutch footballers
Footballers from North Brabant
Association football midfielders
NEC Nijmegen players
TOP Oss players
SC Cambuur players
Go Ahead Eagles players
FC Groningen players
Eerste Divisie players
Eredivisie players
21st-century Dutch people